Israel Victor Welch (January 20, 1822 – May 18, 1869) was an American politician and lawyer during the American Civil War. He served as a member of the Provisional Congress of the Confederate States.

Biography
Welch was born in St. Stephens, Washington County, Alabama, and later moved to Mississippi. He served in the Mississippi Legislature in 1858 was a soldier in the Confederate States Army. He represented the state in the First Confederate Congress and the Second Confederate Congress from 1862 to 1865.

After the end of the Civil War, Welch returned to Macon, Mississippi to practice law. Welch died in Macon on May 18, 1869.

References

 Political Graveyard

1822 births
1869 deaths
People from Washington County, Alabama
Members of the Confederate House of Representatives from Mississippi
19th-century American politicians
Mississippi lawyers
Democratic Party members of the Mississippi House of Representatives
Confederate States Army officers
19th-century American lawyers